Senator Pruitt may refer to:

Ken Pruitt (born 1957), Florida State Senate
Scott Pruitt (born 1968), Oklahoma State Senate